This article covers the history of ancient Portugal, the period between Prehistoric Iberia and County of Portugal.

Pre-Roman people 

Numerous Pre-Roman people of the Iberian Peninsula inhabited the territory now known as Portugal.

Roman rule (3rd century BC – 4th century AD) 

The first Roman invasion of the Iberian Peninsula occurred in 219 BC. Within 200 years, almost the entire peninsula had been annexed to the Roman Republic, starting the Romanization of Hispania. The Carthaginians, Rome's adversary in the Punic Wars, were expelled from their coastal colonies.

The Roman conquest of what is now part of modern-day Portugal took several decades: it started from the south, where the Romans found friendly natives, the Conii. It suffered a severe setback in 150 BC, when a rebellion began in the north. The Lusitanians and other native tribes, under the leadership of Viriathus, wrested control of all of the Portuguese land. Rome sent numerous legions and its best generals to Lusitania to quell the rebellion, but to no avail — the Lusitanians kept conquering territory. The Roman leaders decided to change their strategy. They bribed Viriathus's ambassador to kill his own leader. In 139 BC, Viriathus was assassinated, and the resistance was soon over.

Rome installed a colonial regime. During this period, Lusitania grew in prosperity and many of modern-day Portugal's cities and towns were founded. The complete Romanization of Portugal, intensified during the rule of Augustus, took three centuries and was stronger in Southern Portugal, most of which were administrative dependencies of the Roman city of Pax Julia, currently known as Beja. The city was named Pax Julia in honour of Julius Caesar and to celebrate peace in Lusitania. Augustus renamed it Pax Augusta, but the early name prevailed. In 27 BC, Lusitania gained the status of Roman province. Later, a northern province of Lusitania was formed, known as Gallaecia, with capital in Bracara Augusta, today's Braga.

Numerous Roman sites are scattered around present-day Portugal, some urban remains are quite large, like Conimbriga and Mirobriga. Several works of engineering, such as baths, temples, bridges, roads, circus, theatres and layman's homes are preserved throughout the country. Coins, some of which coined in Portuguese land, sarcophagus and ceramics are numerous. Contemporary historians include Paulus Orosius (c. 375-418) and Hydatius (c. 400–469), bishop of Aquae Flaviae, who reported on the final years of the Roman rule and arrival of the Germanic tribes.

Germanic kingdoms (5th–7th centuries) 

In the early 5th century, Germanic tribes invaded the peninsula, namely the Suevi, the Vandals (Silingi and Hasdingi) and their allies, the Sarmatians and the Alans. Only the kingdom of the Suevi (Quadi and Marcomanni) endured after the arrival of another wave of Germanic invaders, the Visigoths, who conquered all of the Iberian Peninsula and expelled or partially integrated the Vandals and the Alans. The Visigoths eventually conquered the Suevi kingdom and its capital city Bracara in 584–585.

The Germanic tribe of the Buri also accompanied the Suevi in their invasion of the Iberian Peninsula and colonization of Gallaecia (modern northern Portugal and Galicia). The Buri settled in the region between the rivers Cávado and Homem, in the area known as thereafter as Terras de Boiro or Terras de Bouro (Lands of the Buri).

Other minor influences from this period include some 5th century vestiges of Alan settlement, which were found in Alenquer, Coimbra and even Lisbon.

See also
National Museum of Archaeology (Portugal)
Suebic kingdoms
Visigothic kingdoms

References